William Windsor Parker (1802 –  February 1892) was a British Conservative Party politician. He was known as Windsor Parker.

Life
He served for 18 years in the cavalry of the East India Company, 1820–38, and was present with the 10th Bengal Light Cavalry at the siege of Bhurtpore in 1826. Parker was aide-de-camp to the Commander in Chief and interpreter to Lord Combermere, 1825–27.

Parker lived at Clopton Hall, Rattlesden, Suffolk where he was a well-respected and enthusiastic farmer. He died in 1892 and is buried in the Church of St. Mary, with his wife and other members of his family.

Parker was elected to the House of Commons at the 1859 general election as one of the two Members of Parliament (MPs) for the Western division of Suffolk, and held the seat until he stood down at the 1880 general election.

Family
Parker married in India, in 1830, Elizabeth Mary Duncan (died 1883), second daughter of General Alexander Duncan. They had five sons and four daughters. Their children included:

 William Windsor Parker, born 1831/2
 Duncan Parker, born 1834.
 Francis Parker, solicitor, died 1893, unmarried.
 Major (William Windsor) Howard Parker, died 1890, unmarried.
 Elizabeth Gertrude, married in 1873 the Rev. Henry Spelman Marriott.
 Mabel Ellen, married in 1876 James Pearse Napier, son of Robert Napier, 1st Baron Napier of Magdala.

References

External links 
 

1802 births
1892 deaths
Conservative Party (UK) MPs for English constituencies
UK MPs 1859–1865
UK MPs 1865–1868
UK MPs 1868–1874
UK MPs 1874–1880